The Bronx is a cocktail. It is essentially a Perfect Martini with orange juice added. It was ranked number three in "The World's 10 Most Famous Cocktails in 1934" behind the Martini (#1) and the Manhattan (#2).
In the 1934 movie "The Thin Man", the lead actor (William Powell) compared the methods for shaking the Manhattan, the Bronx and the Martini.

History
As with several mixed drinks invented prior to prohibition in the United States, more than one story is attributed to the creation of this cocktail.

Joseph S. Sormani
Two sources credit Joseph S. Sormani as the person responsible for the drink.

In Sormani's New York Times obituary, he was credited with creating the drink:

Johnnie Solan
According to Albert Stevens Crockett, historian of the Waldorf-Astoria Hotel, the inventor of the Bronx cocktail was Johnnie Solan (or Solon). Solon, a pre-Prohibition bartender at the Manhattan hotel, was "popular as one of the best mixers behind its bar counter for most of the latter's history." This is Crockett's account of Solon's own story of the Creation of the Bronx:

Solon would have created the cocktail sometime between 1899 (when he joined the establishment) and 1906 (when the word first appeared in print.) However, a prior reference to a "Bronx Cocktail" on a New York hotel menu indicates that either the name was already in use or Solon was not the original inventor.

Bill W.'s first remembered drink
Bill W., the founder of Alcoholics Anonymous, said that his first drink of alcohol that he could remember was the "Bronx cocktail", given to him by a "socialite" at a party during World War I. This was the beginning of his addiction to alcohol.

Other early citations
It appears in William "Cocktail" Boothby's 1908 book The World's Drinks And How To Mix Them as
"Bronx Cocktail, a la Billy Malloy, Pittsburgh, PA.
One-third Plymouth gin, one-third French vermouth and one-third Italian vermouth, flavored with two dashes of Orange bitters, about a barspoonful of orange juice and a squeeze of orange peel. Serve very cold." Harry Craddock in The Savoy cocktail book mentions three recipes from the Bronx.
The Bronx Cocktail is mentioned in the 1934 film "The Thin Man" by Nick Charles (played by William Powell). In the film, Nick Charles states that the Bronx should be shaken to 2-step time.

Flavors
The Bronx is flavorful and mildly sweet "fruity" drink, without being uninteresting or sticky. Though possibly inspired by the Duplex, the two drinks are not really similar at all. Cocktail columnists Gary Regan and Mardee Haidin Regan describe it as a drink where "[g]in is the base ingredient, orange juice is the mixer, and sweet and dry vermouths are added almost as an afterthought."

See also

 List of cocktails
 Bronx Zoo

References

External links
 

Cocktails with gin
Cocktails with vermouth